The 1994 Team Ice Racing World Championship was the 16th edition of the Team World Championship. The final was held on ?, 1994, in Karlstad, in Sweden. Russia won the title.

Final Classification

See also 
 1994 Individual Ice Speedway World Championship
 1994 Speedway World Team Cup in classic speedway
 1994 Individual Speedway World Championship in classic speedway

References 

Ice speedway competitions
World